Mitchell Barnett (born 15 April 1994) is an Australian professional rugby league footballer who plays as a  and  forward for the New Zealand Warriors in the NRL.

He previously played for the Canberra Raiders and Newcastle Knights in the National Rugby League.

Background
Barnett was born in Taree, New South Wales, Australia.

He started his junior rugby league career with Wingham Tigers Junior Rugby League in 1999, and remained with Wingham JRL until the end of under-16s in 2011, when he was signed by the Newcastle Knights.

Playing career

Early career
After playing in the lower grades at the Newcastle Knights, Barnett joined the Canberra Raiders. 

In 2013 and 2014, he played for Canberra's NYC team.

2015
In 2015, Barnett graduated to Canberra's New South Wales Cup team, Mount Pritchard Mounties. On 10 April, he re-signed with Canberra on a two-year contract. On 3 May, he played for the New South Wales Residents against the Queensland Residents.

In round 22 of the 2015 NRL season, he made his NRL debut for Canberra against the Wests Tigers. On 27 September, he won the 2015 New South Wales Cup Player of the Year award and was named at second-row in the 2015 New South Wales Cup Team of the Year. In November, after Barnett's management discovered his new Canberra contract for the next two seasons hadn't been lodged with the NRL, he opted to instead attempt to sign a more lucrative deal with the Gold Coast Titans. However, after Canberra threatened legal action, the signed contract was discovered and lodged, Barnett returning to Canberra to honour the deal.

2016
On 8 May, Barnett played for the New South Wales Residents against the Queensland Residents for a second year in a row.

On 8 June, he re-joined the Newcastle Knights effective immediately on a contract until the end of 2017, after being released from the final two years of his Canberra Raiders contract. He made his Newcastle debut in round 14 against the New Zealand Warriors. He played nine games for Newcastle in his first season at the club as they finished bottom of the table.

2017
In March, Barnett re-signed with the Newcastle club on a three-year contract until the end of 2020.  He made a total of 22 appearances and scored four tries for Newcastle as the club finished last on the table.

2018
Barnett played 23 games for Newcastle in the 2018 NRL season as the club finished 11th on the table.

2019
In round 11 against the Sydney Roosters, Barnett kicked two goals, with one from the sideline, after regular kicker Kalyn Ponga went off the field with an injury. In December, Barnett re-signed with the Newcastle club on a three-year contract until the end of 2023.

2020
Barnett played 13 games for Newcastle in the 2020 NRL season. He played in Newcastle's first finals game since 2013 which was a 46-20 loss against South Sydney in the elimination final.

2021
Barnett played 24 games for Newcastle in the 2021 NRL season including the club's elimination finals loss against Parramatta.

2022
In round 3 of the 2022 NRL season, Barnett was sent off for using a raised elbow on opponent Chris Smith during Newcastle's 38-20 loss against Penrith, and was subsequently referred to the NRL Judiciary for an ungraded dangerous contact charge. Barnett had pleaded guilty and claimed the contact was careless, however, it was found to be reckless in nature, with a six match suspension handed down in relation to the incident.

In April, Barnett signed a 3-year contract with the New Zealand Warriors starting in 2023, after gaining a release from the final year of his Knights contract.

References

External links
Newcastle Knights profile
NRL profile

1994 births
Living people
Australian rugby league players
Canberra Raiders players
Mount Pritchard Mounties players
Newcastle Knights players
New Zealand Warriors players
Rugby league locks
Rugby league players from Taree
Rugby league props
Rugby league second-rows